The 2018–19 Tennessee Volunteers basketball team represented the University of Tennessee in the 2018–19 NCAA Division I men's basketball season. The Volunteers were led by fourth-year head coach Rick Barnes. The team played its home games at Thompson–Boling Arena in Knoxville, Tennessee, as a member of the Southeastern Conference. They finished the season 31–6, 15–3 to finish in 2nd place. In the SEC Tournament, they defeated Mississippi State and Kentucky to make it to the championship. In the championship, they lost to Auburn.  They received an at-large bid to the NCAA Tournament where they defeated Colgate in the First Round, Iowa in the Second Round before losing in the Sweet Sixteen to Purdue.

Previous season
The Vols finished the 2017–18 NCAA Division I men's basketball season 26–9, 13–5 in SEC play to earn a share of the SEC regular season championship. As the No. 2 seed in the SEC tournament, they defeated Mississippi State and Arkansas before losing to Kentucky in the championship game. They received an at-large bid to the NCAA tournament as the No. 3 seed in the South region. There the Volunteers defeated Wright State before being upset by Loyola–Chicago in the Second Round.

Offseason

Departures

2018 recruiting class

Source:

Roster

Depth chart

Source:

Schedule and results
 
|-
!colspan=12 style=| Exhibition

|-
!colspan=12 style=| Regular season

|-
!colspan=12 style=| SEC Tournament

|-
!colspan=12 style=| NCAA tournament

Rankings

^Coaches' Poll did not release a second poll at the same time as the AP.
*AP does not release post-NCAA Tournament rankings

References

Tennessee
Tennessee Volunteers basketball seasons
Volunteers
Volunteers
Tennessee